Ölziisaikhany Erdene-Ochir (1 April 1936 – 16 November 2017) was a Mongolian wrestler. He competed at the 1964 Summer Olympics and the 1968 Summer Olympics.

References

External links
 

1936 births
2017 deaths
Mongolian male sport wrestlers
Olympic wrestlers of Mongolia
Wrestlers at the 1964 Summer Olympics
Wrestlers at the 1968 Summer Olympics
People from Khövsgöl Province
21st-century Mongolian people
20th-century Mongolian people